Margate Cliftonville was a ward of Margate Municipal District prior to 1973. When the Municipal District was included in the Thanet Borough in 1974, Cliftonville ward elected 3 councillors to the new Borough at the elections of 1973 through to 2003, when it underwent boundary changes.

1973 Election

1976 Election

1979 Election

1983 Election

1987 Election

1991 Election

1995 Election

1999 Election

The election of 2003 was fought on revised boundaries and Cliftonville ward had been split between Cliftonville West and Cliftonville East, each electing three councillors.

Margate